The 2019 Supercupa României was the 21st edition of Romania's season opener cup competition. The game was contested between Liga I title holders, CFR Cluj, and Romanian Cup holders, Viitorul Constanța. It was played at Ilie Oană Stadium in Ploiești in July.

Viitorul Constanța won the trophy for the first time in history, with only one goal scored by Andrei Artean.

Teams

Venue
On 22 May 2019 it was announced that the Supercup might be played on the newly built stadium Tudor Vladimirescu in Târgu Jiu, Romania.
Later, FRF announced that the SuperCup will be played at Ilie Oană Stadium in Ploiești.

Match

Details

Statistics

References

External links
Romania - List of Super Cup Finals, RSSSF.com

2019–20 in Romanian football
Supercupa României
CFR Cluj matches
FC Viitorul Constanța matches
July 2019 sports events in Europe